The 2016 British Artistic Gymnastics Championships were held on 8–10 April 2016 at the Echo Arena, Liverpool, Merseyside.

Background 
The 2016 event marked the sixth time the championships were held at the Echo Arena in Liverpool, and an indoor arena for that matter.

Television coverage 
On 29 January 2016 British Gymnastics announced that the BBC would air the final day of competition.

References 

Artistic Gymnastics
British Artistic
British Artistic Gymnastics Championships
Gymnastics competitions in the United Kingdom
Sports competitions in Liverpool
2010s in Liverpool